Four United States Navy ships have borne the name USS Houston, after the city of Houston, Texas.

  was a cargo ship during World War I
  was a  heavy cruiser commissioned in 1930, and sunk in 1942
  was a  light cruiser commissioned in 1943, and decommissioned in 1947

References

United States Navy ship names